was a Japanese puroresu or professional wrestling promotion, founded in April 2012 by Yoshihiro Tajiri. WNC was the follow-up promotion to Smash, which folded in March 2012.

History
On April 5, 2012, Tajiri held a press conference to announce the forming of Wrestling New Classic, which would hold its first two events on April 26 at Shinjuku Face and on May 24 at Korakuen Hall. The promotion's new financial backer at the time was Tsutomu Takashima, the executive director of real estate company Avance Avant Corporation. WNC continued Smash's working relationship with Finnish professional wrestling promotion Fight Club Finland. Unlike Smash, which held, on average, one event per month, WNC had a more regular schedule, producing three events in its official opening month, May 2012. The promotion is named after a comment made by final Smash Champion Dave Finlay, who, at the promotion's penultimate event, told Tajiri to "keep wrestling classic" with his new promotion. Several WNC wrestlers also booked and promoted their own events in collaboration with the promotion, including Kana's Kana Pro, Makoto's Mako Pro, Syuri's Stimulus, and Takuya Kito's Kuzu Pro.

In late 2013, WNC also established a working relationship with joshi puroresu promotion Reina Joshi Puroresu, as part of which all of WNC's female wrestlers became officially affiliated with both promotions in January 2014. On June 18, 2014, Tajiri held a press conference with Keiji Mutoh, where he announced that WNC would be going inactive following June 26. Afterwards, all female WNC wrestlers remained affiliated with WNC-Reina, while six male wrestlers, Tajiri and Akira included, transferred over to Mutoh's Wrestle-1 promotion. WNC held its final event on June 26, 2014, in Tokyo's Shinjuku Face.

Final roster

Wrestlers

Staff

Alumni

Notable guests

Adam Angel / Backpacker Joe
Arisa Nakajima
Atsushi Kotoge
The Bodyguard
Brahman Kei
Brahman Shu
Carlito
Command Bolshoi
Daisuke Sekimoto
Dave Finlay
Dump Matsumoto
El Samurai
Emil Sitoci
Gedo
Gran Hamada
Jado
Kaoru
Kyoko Kimura
Masato Tanaka
Osamu Nishimura
Maybach Taniguchi

Mikey Whipwreck
Mio Shirai
Misaki Ohata
Miyako Matsumoto
Naomichi Marufuji
Ray Mendoza Jr.
Ricky Marvin
Riho
Serena
StarBuck
Super Crazy
Tadasuke
Taiji Ishimori
Takeshi Morishima
Tatsumi Fujinami
Tommy Dreamer
Tomoka Nakagawa
Toru Yano
Último Dragón
Zeus

Championships

Annual tournaments

See also

Professional wrestling in Japan

References

External links

Wrestling New Classic on YouTube

Japanese professional wrestling promotions
2012 establishments in Japan
2014 disestablishments in Japan
Minato, Tokyo